Louisa Elizabeth Collings (née Lukis; 4 June 1818 or 1828 – 24 March 1887) was an amateur lichenologist and natural history collector from the Channel Islands. She was the wife of William Thomas Collings, Seigneur of Sark, and an ancestor of all subsequent seigneurs.

Collection 

Collings was born either on 4 June 1818 or in 1828 as the eldest of the three daughters. Her parents were the Channel Islands naturalist, collector and antiquarian Frederick Lukis by his wife and first cousin Elizabeth (née Collings). Due to the early 19th-century views on female education, Collings and her sisters probably did not receive any formal schooling. Her interest in lichens was most likely due to the influence of her father, from whom she probably inherited many of the local specimens; her brother, William Collings Lukis, also shared their father's interests. Collings swapped her specimens with other collectors, including the family friend, Charles du Bois Larbalestier of Jersey, eventually amassing a collection of over 1,300 lichens held in a set of 32 folders and small box files. She also took time in 1862 to compile a list of 150 species of lichens that appear on the island of Guernsey, and presented it to the geologist David T. Ansted, who was working on a book about the Channel Islands.

Family 

Louisa Lukis married her cousin, William Thomas Collings, on 15 June 1847. The ceremony was conducted by her brother, William Collings Lukis, at St Saviour's Church. They had four daughters and two sons, William Frederick (1852–1927) and Henry de Vic (1855–1872). On the death of her mother-in-law Marie the next year, her husband became Seigneur of Sark. She was widowed in 1882, when the fief of Sark passed to her son; the seigneur from 1974, Michael Beaumont, is her descendant. Collings decided to pay a visit to her eldest daughter, Mary Edmeades, who lay ill in Folkestone. She died there on 24 March 1887, having suffered from bronchitis for three days, shortly after her daughter. She had outlived all her children except for the Seigneur; her other daughters died respectively in 1851, 1859 and 1871. Her collection passed to Guernsey's newly established Guille-Allès Museum. It is considered one of the city's most important natural history collections.

References 

Year of birth uncertain
1887 deaths
British collectors
Deaths from bronchitis
British lichenologists
Natural history collectors
Women botanists
British botanists
People from the Channel Islands